Modern Public School is a private co-educational Indian school located in Meghadambaru, Balasore, Odisha.

History and operations
Founded in 1997, it is associated with the Central Board of Secondary Education.

The school hosts the State Level Annual Inter School Quest competition, participated in by schools from all over Odisha.

It provides day-scholar as well as a boarding facility (only for boys) in its own Shivaji Hostel.

Sports
The school provides training in sports, including cricket, tennis, and swimming.

See also

 List of schools in Odisha

References

External links
 

1997 establishments in Orissa
Boarding schools in Odisha
Co-educational schools in India
Education in Balasore district
Educational institutions established in 1997
High schools and secondary schools in Odisha
Private schools in Odisha